Princess Muneko (統子内親王; 13 August 1126 – 20 July 1189), later known as Jōsaimon-in (上西門院), was a princess and an Empress of Japan. 

She was the daughter of Emperor Toba and Fujiwara no Tamako. She served as Saiin at Kamo Shrine in 1127–1132. She retired from her service as priestess for health reasons. She served as honorary interim empress of her nephew Emperor Nijō awaiting the appointment of a permanent empress. She retired when her nephew married his aunt, her half-sister Princess Yoshiko (Nijō). 

In 1160, following her mother's example, she took ordination as a Buddhist nun at Hōkongō-in.

Notes

Japanese empresses
1126 births
1189 deaths
Japanese Buddhist nuns
12th-century Buddhist nuns
Japanese princesses
Japanese priestesses
Daughters of emperors